Savadi is a village in the Karmala taluka of Solapur district in Maharashtra state, India.

Demographics
Covering  and comprising 685 households at the time of the 2011 census of India, Savadi had a population of 3119. There were 1606 males and 1513 females, with 333 people being aged six or younger.

References

Villages in Karmala taluka